Boulter is a surname. Notable people with the surname include:

 Beau Boulter (born 1942), member of the United States House of Representatives
 Edmund Boulter (1635-1709), London merchant
 Eric Boulter (born 1952), Australian Paralympic swimmer
 George Henry Boulter (born 1825), Ontario physician and political figure
 Hugh Boulter (1672-1742), Church of Ireland Archbishop of Armagh
 Katie Boulter (born 1996), British tennis player
 Les Boulter (footballer) (1913–1975), Welsh footballer
 Michael Boulter (born 1942), British paleontologist
 Roy Boulter (born 1964), English rock drummer
 Russell Boulter (born 1963), British actor
 Stanley Boulter (1852-1917), British lawyer and businessman
 William Ewart Boulter (1892-1955), English recipient of the Victoria Cross

Fictional characters
 Brendan Boulter, a fictional character in soap opera Family Affairs
 Kelly Boulter, a fictional character in soap opera Family Affairs
 Les Boulter, a fictional character in soap opera Family Affairs

See also
 Bolter (disambiguation)
 Boulder (disambiguation)